Leopold William Stanley Morgan (3 May 1913 – 31 March 1995) was an Australian rules footballer who played for Collingwood in the Victorian Football League (VFL) during the 1930s and early 1940s.

He made his Collingwood debut in round 14, 1933. He played 82 CFC games with a total of 7 CFC goals.

Small and pacy, Morgan was recruited to Collingwood from Abbotsford. He was a wingman in Collingwood's 1935 and 1936 premiership sides as well as in the losing 1938 Grand Final team.

Morgan later served in the Royal Australian Air Force during World War II.

References

Holmesby, Russell and Main, Jim (2007). The Encyclopedia of AFL Footballers. 7th ed. Melbourne: Bas Publishing.

External links

1913 births
Australian rules footballers from Victoria (Australia)
Collingwood Football Club players
Collingwood Football Club Premiership players
1995 deaths
Two-time VFL/AFL Premiership players